The Williams sisters are two professional American tennis players: Venus Williams (b. 1980), a seven-time Grand Slam title winner (singles), and Serena Williams (b. 1981), twenty-three-time Grand Slam title winner (singles), both of whom were coached from an early age by their parents Richard Williams and Oracene Price.

Both sisters have been ranked by the Women's Tennis Association at the world No. 1 position in both singles and doubles. In 2002, after the French Open, Venus and Serena Williams were ranked world No. 1 and No. 2 on singles, respectively, marking the first time in history that sisters occupied the top two positions. On 21 June 2010, Serena and Venus again held the No. 1 and No. 2 rankings spots in singles, respectively, some eight years after first accomplishing this feat. At the time, Serena was three months shy of her 29th birthday and Venus had just celebrated her 30th birthday.

There is a noted professional rivalry between the sisters in singles — between the 2001 US Open and the 2017 Australian Open, they contested nine major finals. They became the first two players, female or male, to contest four consecutive major singles finals, from the 2002 French Open to the 2003 Australian Open; Serena famously won all four to complete the first of two "Serena Slams" (non-calendar year Grand Slams). Between 2000 and 2016, they collectively won 12 Wimbledon singles titles (Venus five, and Serena seven). Nonetheless, they remain very close, often watching each other's matches in support, even after one of them had been knocked out of a tournament.

By winning the 2001 Australian Open doubles title, they became the fifth pair of women to complete the career Grand Slam in doubles, and the only pair to complete the career Golden Slam in doubles. At the time, Venus and Serena were only 20 and 19 years old, respectively. Since then, they have gone on to add another two Olympic gold medals at the 2008 Beijing Olympics and the 2012 London Olympics. Moreover, the duo would go on to win a non-calendar year Grand Slam in doubles between 2009 Wimbledon and 2010 Roland Garros, which made them the co-No. 1 doubles players on 7 June 2010. Their most recent major doubles title came at the 2016 Wimbledon Championships.

Both players have won four gold medals at the Olympics, one each in singles and three in doubles— all won together— the most of any tennis players. Venus has also won a silver in mixed doubles at the 2016 Rio Olympics. As a duo, they have also completed the double career Golden Slam in doubles.  Between the two of them, they have completed the Boxed Set, winning all four grand slams in singles, women's doubles, and mixed doubles. They split all four mixed doubles titles in 1998.



Doubles: 23 (22 titles, 1 runner-up)

Team competition finals: 1 (1 titles)

Performance timelines

Women's doubles

 Neither withdrawals nor walkovers are included in wins and losses.

Note: Serena Williams did not play at the 2004 Olympics because of injury. Venus partnered with American Chanda Rubin and lost in the first round to eventual gold-medalists Sun Tiantian and Li Ting.

Boycott of the Indian Wells Masters
During the 2001 Indian Wells Masters tournament in Indian Wells, California, controversy erupted when Venus Williams withdrew four minutes prior to her semifinal match with her sister Serena.

The following day, Serena played Kim Clijsters in the final. Venus and her father, (coach to her and Serena) Richard Williams were booed as they made their way to their seats. Serena was booed intermittently during the final, in which she defeated Clijsters, 4–6, 6–4, 6–2, and even during the presentation ceremony.

Richard accused the crowds at Indian Wells of overt racism, saying, "The white people at Indian Wells, what they've been wanting to say all along to us finally came out: 'Nigger, stay away from here, we don't want you here'". However, no other reports of verbal racism were reported to tournament officials, although Venus has stated without elaboration, "I heard what he heard." Oracene Price (mother and coach of Venus and Serena) accused the crowd of "taking off their hoods".

Effects and criticism
After the initial controversy, neither Williams sister played the tournament in Indian Wells for 14 years. The Women's Tennis Association currently classifies the Indian Wells tournament as a Premier Mandatory event for all eligible players. Exceptions are made when players engage in tournament promotions, but Venus and Serena both declined to promote the tournament; WTA Tour CEO Larry Scott agreed he would not, promotionally, "put them in a position that is going to be awkward," and tournament director Charlie Pasarell has stated he would accept the WTA tour's ruling.

Allegations had been made before Venus's withdrawal that Richard Williams decided who won the matches between his daughters. Those allegations continued and increased as a result of her withdrawal.

Richard has said that racial epithets were used against him and Venus as they sat in the stands during the final, but no official complaints were recorded by the tournament. Venus and Serena have been criticized for refusing to discuss the controversy, as some believe that their silence perpetuates racism.

Serena discusses what happened in her view at Indian Wells in detail in an entire chapter titled "The Fiery Darts of Indian Wells" in her 2009 autobiography, On the Line. She says that on the morning of the semifinal, Venus told the tour trainer that she had injured her knee and didn't think she could play and tried for hours to get approval from the trainer to withdraw, but the tournament officials kept stalling.

What got me most of all was that it wasn't just a scattered bunch of boos. It wasn't coming from just one section. It was like the whole crowd got together and decided to boo all at once. The ugliness was just raining down on me, hard. I didn't know what to do. Nothing like this had ever happened to me. What was most surprising about this uproar was the fact that tennis fans are typically a well-mannered bunch. They're respectful. They sit still. And in Palm Springs, especially, they tended to be pretty well-heeled, too. But I looked up and all I could see was a sea of rich people—mostly older, mostly white—standing and booing lustily, like some kind of genteel lynch mob. I don't mean to use such inflammatory language to describe the scene, but that's really how it seemed from where I was down on the court. Like these people were gonna come looking for me after the match. ... There was no mistaking that all of this was meant for me. I heard the word nigger a couple times, and I knew. I couldn't believe it. That's just not something you hear in polite society on that stadium court ... Just before the start of play, my dad and Venus started walking down the aisle to the players' box by the side of the court, and everybody turned and started to point and boo at them ... It was mostly just a chorus of boos, but I could still hear shouts of 'Nigger!' here and there. I even heard one angry voice telling us to go back to Compton. It was unbelievable ... We refused to return to Indian Wells. Even now, all these years later, we continue to boycott the event. It's become a mandatory tournament on the tour, meaning that the WTA can fine a player if she doesn't attend. But I don't care if they fine me a million dollars, I will not play there again.

However, on February 3, 2015, Serena Williams wrote an exclusive column for Time magazine stating her intentions to return to Indian Wells for a tournament on March 9, 2015. She did indeed return and won her opening match. Williams withdrew before her semi-final match with Simona Halep because of a knee injury.

The WTA announced on January 27, 2016, that Venus would return to Indian Wells for the first time in 15 years.

Best result in Grand Slam singles (combined)

(W) Won tournament: final contested by the Williams sisters.

Year-end WTA ranking

See also
 Williams sisters rivalry
 Klitschko brothers - similarly dominant boxing brothers

References

Further reading
 Edmondson, Jacqueline (2005). Venus and Serena Williams: A Biography. Westport, Conn: Greenwood Press. 

 Serena Williams
 Venus Williams
 1980s births
 Living people
 20th-century African-American people
 20th-century African-American women
 21st-century African-American sportspeople
 21st-century African-American women
 African-American female tennis players
 American female tennis players
 Australian Open (tennis) champions
 French Open champions
 Grand Slam (tennis) champions in mixed doubles
 Grand Slam (tennis) champions in women's doubles
 Grand Slam (tennis) champions in women's singles
 Medalists at the 2000 Summer Olympics
 Medalists at the 2008 Summer Olympics
 Medalists at the 2012 Summer Olympics
 Olympic gold medalists for the United States in tennis
 People from Palm Beach Gardens, Florida
 Sibling duos
 Sports families of the United States
 Sportspeople from Compton, California
 Sportspeople from Saginaw, Michigan
 Sportspeople from West Palm Beach, Florida
 Tennis doubles teams
 Tennis people from California
 Tennis people from Florida
 Tennis people from Michigan
 Tennis players at the 2000 Summer Olympics
 Tennis players at the 2008 Summer Olympics
 Tennis players at the 2012 Summer Olympics
 US Open (tennis) champions
 Wimbledon champions
 Williams family (tennis)